Ellesmere Port and Neston was, from 1974 to 2009, a local government district with borough status in Cheshire, England. It covered the southern part of the Wirral Peninsula, namely that part which is not included in the Metropolitan Borough of Wirral.

The district had a population of about 81,800 (2006 estimate). The main towns were Ellesmere Port and Neston as well as the village of Parkgate. It also included a number of villages such as Great Sutton and Willaston.

History
The district was created on 1 April 1974 under the Local Government Act 1972 by the merger of the borough of Ellesmere Port and the urban district of Neston. The district was originally called just Ellesmere Port, with the council changing the name in 1976. The new district was awarded borough status from its creation, allowing the chairman of the council to take the title of mayor.

In 2006 the Department for Communities and Local Government considered reorganising Cheshire's administrative structure as part of the 2009 structural changes to local government in England. The decision to merge Ellesmere Port and Neston with the districts of Chester and Vale Royal to create a single unitary authority was announced on 25 July 2007, following a consultation period in which a proposal to create a single Cheshire unitary authority was rejected.

Ellesmere Port and Neston was abolished on 31 March 2009, with the area becoming part of the new unitary authority of Cheshire West and Chester from 1 April 2009.

Civil parishes
The entire borough was initially unparished. A civil parish of Ince was created in 1987, and a Neston parish was created in 2008.

Political control
The town of Ellesmere Port had been a municipal borough from 1955 to 1974 with a borough council. The first elections to the new Ellesmere Port Borough Council created under the Local Government Act 1972 were held in 1973, initially operating as a shadow authority until the new arrangements came into effect on 1 April 1974. Political control the council from 1974 until its abolition in 2009 was always held by the Labour Party:

Leadership
The first leader of the council, Fred Venables, had been the leader of the old Ellesmere Port Borough Council since 1970. The leaders of Ellesmere Port and Neston Borough Council were:

Composition
The political composition of the council at its abolition in 2009 was:

Premises

The council was based at the Council Offices at 4 Civic Way, Ellesmere Port, which had been built for the old borough council in 1969. Council meetings were held at nearby Whitby Hall until 1992 when an extension containing a council chamber was opened at the Municipal Buildings. Following the abolition of the council the Council Offices were used by its successor, Cheshire West and Chester Council, until 2022 when they were replaced by a new building called "The Portal" on Wellington Road.

Council elections
1973 Ellesmere Port Borough Council election
1976 Ellesmere Port Borough Council election (New ward boundaries)
1979 Ellesmere Port and Neston Borough Council election
1980 Ellesmere Port and Neston Borough Council election
1982 Ellesmere Port and Neston Borough Council election
1983 Ellesmere Port and Neston Borough Council election
1984 Ellesmere Port and Neston Borough Council election
1986 Ellesmere Port and Neston Borough Council election
1987 Ellesmere Port and Neston Borough Council election
1988 Ellesmere Port and Neston Borough Council election
1990 Ellesmere Port and Neston Borough Council election
1991 Ellesmere Port and Neston Borough Council election
1992 Ellesmere Port and Neston Borough Council election
1994 Ellesmere Port and Neston Borough Council election (Borough boundary changes took place but the number of seats remained the same)
1995 Ellesmere Port and Neston Borough Council election
1996 Ellesmere Port and Neston Borough Council election
1998 Ellesmere Port and Neston Borough Council election
1999 Ellesmere Port and Neston Borough Council election (New ward boundaries)
2000 Ellesmere Port and Neston Borough Council election
2002 Ellesmere Port and Neston Borough Council election
2003 Ellesmere Port and Neston Borough Council election
2004 Ellesmere Port and Neston Borough Council election
2006 Ellesmere Port and Neston Borough Council election
2007 Ellesmere Port and Neston Borough Council election

By-election results

External links
Ellesmere Port and Neston Council

References 

 
Council elections in Cheshire
District council elections in England
Districts of England established in 1974
English districts abolished in 2009
Former non-metropolitan districts of Cheshire
Former boroughs in England
Ellesmere Port
Neston